Kaiyuan South railway station is a railway station in Kaiyuan, Honghe Hani and Yi Autonomous Prefecture, Yunnan, China. It is an intermediate station on the Mile–Mengzi high-speed railway.

History
Construction began in July 2020. The station opened on 16 December 2022.

References 

Railway stations in Yunnan